Ruben Hakhverdyan (born December 3, 1950) is a popular Armenian poet, guitarist, singer, songwriter, and lyricist. He attended Yerevan's theater institute and in 1975, earned his degree in television and theater direction. He worked for the city's State Television Network.

Hakhverdyan is one of the founders of Bard music in Armenia. His songs are extremely popular in Armenia. They include the song Navak (Armenian: Նավակ – Boat), which is his most famous children's song. Other popular songs include Mer Siro Ashuny (Armenian: Մեր Սիրո աշունը – The Autumn of Our Love) which is one of Armenia's best known romantic songs. Three songs that Hakhverdyan himself says have influenced him most and have been his all-time favorites are Eleanor Rigby by The Beatles, Amsterdam by Jacques Brel and It's a Man's World by James Brown.

Biography and career
Ruben Hakhverdyan  was born in 1950 in Yerevan to the family of linguist and academician Levon Hakhverdyan and philologist, critic and translator Sona Ayunts. From 1969–1974 he studied and graduated from Yerevan Fine Arts and Theatre Institute. In 1971 he got 2-month internship at Moscow Satire Theatre in the class of Mark Zakharov. In 1968–1989 Hakhverdyan worked in the Armenian State Television Network, initially as an assistant director and later as a director.

Hakhverdyan staged plays at Yerevan Sundukyan State Academic and at Hrachya Ghaplanyan Drama theaters. In 1989 Hakhverdyan left his job at television and acted as a free artist.

Ruben Hakhverdyan is an author of a number of CDs, the first one being "Songs of Love and Hope" issued in Paris in 1985. The best known songs are "Snow" ("Ձյունը"),  "The Dogs" ("Շները"), "In the Nights of Yerevan" ("Երևանի գիշերներում") and many others. In 1996 he created "My Home on the Wheels" concert-performance, as well as children's songs.

Hakhverdian's songs are used in the "Found Dream" (1976) animated cartoon which is very popular in Armenia. One of the best known songs by the composer is the song called "Star-Spangled Night" since it appeared in "Found Dream" animation cartoon. In 1990, Hakhverdyan starred in Harutyun Khachatryan's "Wind of Oblivion" film and in 2009, he starred in the film "Endless Return" by Harutyun Khachatryan.

He has performed in France, United States, Yugoslavia, Italy, Lebanon, Germany, Czech Republic, Serbia, Iran, Syria, Lebanon.

Discography
 The Best of Ruben Hakhverdyan (1985)
 Rouben, Lilit & Vahan (1989)
 Destiny (1994)
 Midnight (1997)
 This is Yerevan (1997)
 Yerke Nayev Aghotk E (2000)
 Yerg (2000)
 Anthology (2001)
 For the Children from 0 to 100 Years Old (2002)
 That Our Mountains Are Not Left Orphan (2014)
 Testament (2017)

Filmography

Composer
 1976 - Found Dream (Short)
 1990 - Wind of Oblivion
 1998 - Yerevan Blues 
 2001 - Roof to Roof
 2014 - Seeds (Short)

Actor
 1990 - Wind of Oblivion

Awards
 Movses Khorenatsi medal, 1998.
 Gold Medal of the Ministry of Culture, 2006.
 In 2008 Hakhverdyan's album "For the Children from 0 to 100 Years Old" won "Ara and Maral" Award by Tekeyan Cultural Association.

References

External links
 Ruben Hakhverdian
 Discography

20th-century Armenian male singers
1950 births
Living people
Musicians from Yerevan
21st-century Armenian male singers